Ferdinand Gagnon (8 June 1849 – 15 April 1886) was a Canadian born American journalist.

Gagnon was born and educated in Saint-Hyacinthe, Canada East. At age 19, he joined a substantial group of French Canadians who were leaving the now province of Quebec for the newly forming New England states to escape the British rule. He began his American residency at Manchester, N.H.

Gagnon envisaged a national union of the French Canadians in Canada and those in the United States. He saw this union as something that would happen sooner or later and worked toward that goal. He put forth a concerted effort for a period of time toward repatriation of Franco-Americans to Quebec. This effort was largely unsuccessful.

His vocation was publishing and journalism and he was involved in a number of publications starting with La Voix du peuple. This publication ceased and was replaced by L’Idée nouvelle. In 1869 Gagnon married and settled in Worcester, Mass. where he started the L’Étendard national.

Gagnon continued to support his view of the French Canadian émigrés which was not always popular with the émigrés themselves. His early death at age 36 ended his involvement of this diverse cause.

There is a statue of Gagnon in Lafayette Park in the city of Manchester, New Hampshire.

References 

 
 L'Étendard national

1849 births
1886 deaths
People from Saint-Hyacinthe
19th-century American journalists
American male journalists
19th-century American male writers